The Lordship of Botrun was a fief around the small town of Botrun (now Batroun in Lebanon) in the County of Tripoli. The crusaders occupied Botrun in 1104, then the lordship was formed in 1115, until it was seized by the Mamluks of Qalawun in 1289.

Lords of Botrun
Raymond of Agoult, before 1174
William Dorel, until 1174
Cecilia (Lucia), 1174–1181/1206; married Plivain
Isabella, 1206–1244; married Bohemond of Botron, son of Bohemond III
William, 1244–1262
John I, 1262–1277
Rudolf (Rostain), 1277–1289

References

Sources 

 
 
 
 

 
1100s in the Crusader states
1289 in Asia
Lordships of the Crusader states